Daniel Murphy may refer to:

Sportsmen

Association football (soccer)
Danny Murphy (footballer, born 1922) (1922–2001), English football player
Danny Murphy (footballer, born 1977), English international football player for Liverpool, Fulham and Blackburn Rovers
Danny Murphy (footballer, born 1982), Irish football player for Motherwell, Dunfermline Athletic and Cork City

Baseball
Danny Murphy (catcher) (1864–1915), American baseball catcher
Danny Murphy (second baseman) (1876–1955), American baseball second baseman
Danny Murphy (pitcher) (born 1942), American baseball pitcher
Dan Murphy (baseball) (born 1964), American baseball pitcher
Daniel Murphy (baseball) (born 1985), American baseball second baseman

Other sports
Danny Murphy (Australian footballer, born 1884) (1884–1956), Australian footballer for Fitzroy
Danny Murphy (Australian footballer, born 1960), Australian footballer for North Melbourne
Dan Murphy (sportscaster) (born 1970), Canadian hockey reporter
Dan Murphy (hurler) (born 1977), Irish sportsman
Dan Murphy (rugby union) (born 1985), English rugby union player

Arts
Danny Murphy (American actor) (1955–2014)
Danny Murphy (British actor) (born 2004)
Dan Murphy (musician) (born 1962), American guitarist for Soul Asylum

Other people 
Daniel Thomas Turley Murphy (born 1943), American-born bishop in the Roman Catholic Church
Daniel D. Murphy (1866-1944), American farmer, businessman, and politician
Daniel J. Murphy (1922–2001), American navy admiral
Daniel J. Murphy (botanist), Australian botanist
Dan Murphy (trade unionist) (born 1946), Irish former trade union leader
Daniel Murphy (computer scientist) (born 1929), American computer scientist
Daniel Murphy (bishop) (1815–1907), Australian Roman Catholic Archbishop of Hobart
Daniel Francis Murphy (1918–2001), Australian retailer; see Dan Murphy's
Daniel Murphy, philanthropist after whom Daniel Murphy High School in Los Angeles, U.S. is named
Daniel "Spud" Murphy, a character in Trainspotting
Daniel P. Murphy, owner of all Prince Edward Island Tim Hortons restaurants

See also
Dan Murphy's, an Australian liquor company